Robert Macfarlane (14 May 1876 – 27 July 1943) was a Scottish footballer who played as a goalkeeper for Morton, Third Lanark, Everton, East Stirlingshire, Bristol St George's, Grimsby Town, Celtic, Middlesbrough, Aberdeen, Motherwell and Scotland.

References

Sources

External links

1876 births
1943 deaths
Association football goalkeepers
Scottish footballers
Scotland international footballers
Greenock Morton F.C. players
Third Lanark A.C. players
Everton F.C. players
East Stirlingshire F.C. players
Grimsby Town F.C. players
Celtic F.C. players
Middlesbrough F.C. players
Aberdeen F.C. players
Motherwell F.C. players
English Football League players
Scottish Football League players
Scottish Football League representative players
Footballers from Greenock
Place of death missing